Grzegorz Gilewski (born 24 February 1973 in Radom, Poland) is a Polish football referee.

On 9 November 2008 Gilewski was detained by CBA in an investigation related to match-fixing in Polish football. He was charged the next day with three crimes: match-fixing, accepting bribes worth 120,000 PLN (ca. 30,000 EUR) and participation in an organised criminal group.

He was preselected as a referee for the 2010 FIFA World Cup.

References 

Living people
Polish football referees
1973 births
People from Radom
Sportspeople from Masovian Voivodeship